Sasse Lake is a lake in Le Sueur County, in the U.S. state of Minnesota.

Sasse Lake was named for William Frederick Sasse, pioneer settlers.

References

Lakes of Minnesota
Lakes of Le Sueur County, Minnesota